Son Darbe is a 1985 Turkish adventure film, directed by Halit Refiğ and starring Tarık Akan, Nilgün Akçaoğlu and Yıldırım Gencer.

References

External links

1985 films
Turkish adventure films
1980s adventure films
Films directed by Halit Refiğ